The 2015 New Zealand Open Grand Prix Gold was the sixth grand prix gold and grand prix tournament of the 2015 BWF Grand Prix and Grand Prix Gold. The tournament was held in North Shore Events Centre, Auckland, New Zealand between 28 April and 3 May 2015 and had a total purse of $120,000.

Men's singles

Seeds

  Hsu Jen-hao (semi-final)
  Wong Wing Ki (third round)
  Lee Hyun-il (champion)
  Dionysius Hayom Rumbaka (third round)
  Ng Ka Long (quarter-final)
  Simon Santoso (first round)
  Boonsak Ponsana (semi-final)
  Derek Wong Zi Liang (second round)
  Chong Wei Feng (third round)
  Zulfadli Zulkiffli (third round)
  Anand Pawar (third round)
  Mohamad Arif Abdul Latif (quarter-final)
  Howard Shu (first round)
  Liew Daren (withdrew)
  Tan Chun Seang (withdrew)
  Goh Soon Huat (quarter-final)

Finals

Top half

Section 1

Section 2

Section 3

Section 4

Bottom half

Section 5

Section 6

Section 7

Section 8

Women's singles

Seeds

  Adriyanti Firdasari (withdrew)
  Chen Jiayuan (second round)
  Iris Wang (withdrew)
  Maria Febe Kusumastuti (quarter-final)
  Cheung Ngan Yi (semi-final)
  Neslihan Yigit (withdrew)
  Ozge Bayrak (withdrew)
  Aya Ohori (semi-final)

Finals

Top half

Section 1

Section 2

Bottom half

Section 3

Section 4

Men's doubles

Seeds

  Danny Bawa Chrisnanta / Chayut Triyachart (first round)
  Andrei Adistia / Hendra Aprida Gunawan (first round)
  Li Junhui / Liu Yuchen (quarter-final)
  Raphael Beck / Andreas Heinz (second round)
  Goh V Shem / Tan Wee Kiong (quarter-final)
  Hoon Thien How / Lim Khim Wah (semi-final)
  Fajar Alfian / Muhammad Rian Ardianto (final)
  Berry Angriawan / Ryan Agung Saputra (second round)

Finals

Top half

Section 1

Section 2

Bottom half

Section 3

Section 4

Women's doubles

Seeds

Finals

Top half

Section 1

Section 2

Bottom half

Section 3

Section 4

Mixed doubles

Seeds

  Riky Widianto /  Richi Puspita Dili (semi-final)
  Danny Bawa Chrisnanta / Vanessa Neo Yu Yan (first round)
  Markis Kido / Pia Zebadiah Bernadeth (semi-final)
  Ronald Alexander / Melati Daeva Oktaviani (second round)
  Zheng Siwei / Chen Qingchen (champion)
  Huang Kaixiang / Zhong Qianxin (second round)
  Fran Kurniawan / Komala Dewi (quarter-final)
  Chayut Triyachart / Shinta Mulia Sari (quarter-final)

Finals

Top half

Section 1

Section 2

Bottom half

Section 3

Section 4

References

New Zealand Open (badminton)
BWF Grand Prix Gold and Grand Prix
New Zealand Open Grand Prix
New Zealand Open Grand Prix
Sport in Auckland
April 2015 sports events in New Zealand
May 2015 sports events in New Zealand